Espen Dahlhaug Bjørnstad (born 26 December 1993) is a Norwegian nordic combined skier.

At the 2013 Junior World Championships he competed in three events, recording an individual 8th place and a team competition 6th place. He made his Continental Cup debut in 2013 and recorded his first podium in January 2017 in Otepää. He made his World Cup debut in January 2014 in Chaykovsky, then did not compete in 2014–15 or 2015–16. He finished among the top 30 for the first time in February 2017 with a 29th place in Pyeongchang.

He represents the sports club Byåsen SK.

References

External links
 
 
 
 

1993 births
Living people
Sportspeople from Trondheim
Norwegian male Nordic combined skiers
FIS Nordic World Ski Championships medalists in Nordic combined
Nordic combined skiers at the 2022 Winter Olympics
Olympic Nordic combined skiers of Norway
Olympic gold medalists for Norway
Medalists at the 2022 Winter Olympics
Olympic medalists in Nordic combined
21st-century Norwegian people